The following is a list of events affecting American television in 2013. Events listed include television show debuts, finales, and cancellations; channel launches, closures, and rebrandings; stations changing or adding their network affiliations; and information about changes of ownership of channels or stations, controversies and carriage disputes.

Events

January

February

March

April

May

June

July

August

September

October

November

December

Television programs

Programs debuting in 2013

Entering syndication in 2013
A list of programs (current or canceled) that have accumulated enough episodes (between 65 and 100) or seasons (3 or more) to be eligible for off-network syndication and/or basic cable runs.

Network changes
The following shows will air new episodes on a different network than previous first-run episodes.

Programs returning in 2013
The following shows will return with new episodes after being canceled or ended their run previously:

Milestone episodes

Programs ending in 2013

Made-for-TV movies and miniseries

Television stations

Launches

Network affiliation changes
The following is a list of television stations that have made or will make noteworthy network affiliation changes in 2013.

Closures

Deaths

January

February

March

April

May

June

July

August

September

October

November

December

See also
 2013 in the United States
 List of American films of 2013

References

External links
List of 2013 American television series at IMDb

 
2013